Iliana Fox (born Iliana Jan Fox Gaitan on 3 January 1977) is a Mexican actress and voice actress.

Fox grew up in Mexico, but with periods of residence in Canada and the UK. She has participated in various telenovelas such as Machos and Mirada de Mujer: El Regreso. She studied singing with Carlos Fernández and later enrolled in the TV Azteca School (CEFAC) where she studied with Raúl Quintanilla. Her first telenovela was Señora. Her first leading role was in Ellas in 1999. In her first major film, Kilometer 31, she played the lead.

Personal life 
Fox was in a relationship for several years with Mexican actor José María Yazpik with whom she had a daughter.

Filmography

Films

Television

References

External links
 
TV Azteca

1977 births
Living people
Mexican telenovela actresses
Mexican television actresses
English television actresses
Mexican film actresses
English film actresses
Actresses from London
21st-century Mexican actresses
21st-century English actresses
People educated at Centro de Estudios y Formación Actoral